Arraia-Maeztu, is a municipality located in the province of Álava, in the Basque Country, northern Spain.

This municipality was formed in 1958 by the merger of the municipalities of Apellániz, Arraya and Laminoria. It was originally called Maestu, but in 1987 adopted its current name.

Geography

Administrative subdivisions 
The municipality contains 16 villages, organized into 10 concejos.

Notable people
  (1696–1773), Jesuit priest and poet. He wrote primarily in Spanish, but some of his poems were in Basque and are of great importance to the study of the  history of the language.

References

External links
 

Municipalities in Álava
1958 establishments in the Basque Country (autonomous community)